Mesaxonia (near-synonymous with Panperissodactyla) is a clade of ungulates whose weight is distributed on the third toe on all legs through the plane symmetry of their feet. For a while it was often seen to only contain the order Perissodactyla (which includes the equines, rhinos and tapirs). Recent work in morphological cladistics and ancient DNA suggests that several extinct lineages, like the Desmostylia and some of the South American ungulates of Meridiungulata (both groups traditionally seen as Afrotherian relatives) are related to the perissodactyls.

Classification 
Mesaxonia
†Dinocerata
†Phenacodontidae
Panperissodactyla
†Anthracobunia
†Anthracobunidae
†Cambaytheriidae
†Desmostylia? 
†Litopterna
†Notoungulata
Perissodactyla

References

External links 

Ungulates
Taxa described in 1884
Mammal taxonomy
Controversial mammal taxa